John Tallach (24 September 1890 – 30 October 1955) was a Free Presbyterian minister in Scotland who served as Moderator of Synod in both 1933 and 1947.

In 1958, the John Tallach High School, a mission school  from Bulawayo in Zimbabwe, was opened.

Life
Tallach was born on 24 September 1890 in Dornoch. His younger brother was James Andrew Tallach, Moderator of Synod in 1934, 1944 and 1957.

He was licensed to preach by the Free Presbyterian Church of Scotland in September 1924 and chose to do missionary work in Africa, travelling to what was then Rhodesia (now Zimbabwe) in October 1924 to join Rev John Boyana Radasi in Ingwenya, where they ran a boarding school. He did much work there and also married and raised his children there. He was known as Mfundisi Tallach ([isiNdebele] for Pastor Tallach).

They returned to Scotland in 1947 and in 1949 he found a new post in Oban and remained there for the rest of his life.

He died on 30 October 1955 and was buried in Pennyfuir Cemetery in Oban.

Family
Tallach married Ann (Annie) Sinclair, daughter of R R Sinclair. She died in 2004 aged 104. Her brother Robert Ross Sinclair was also a Moderator of Synod.

They had three daughters and two sons, including Ian R. Tallach who was born in Ingwenya.

He was uncle to Samuel Fraser Tallach, Moderator of Synod in 1987.

References

1890 births
1955 deaths
People from Sutherland
Scottish Presbyterian missionaries
Presbyterian missionaries in Zimbabwe
Ministers of the Free Presbyterian Church of Scotland